

Rien may refer to:

Given name
The Dutch given name is usually a short form of Marinus/Rinus 

Rien van IJzendoorn (born 1952), Dutch professor of child and family studies
Rien Kaashoek (born 1937), Dutch mathematician
Rien Long (born 1983), American college football player
Rien Morris, Marshallese government minister 
Rien Poortvliet (1932–1985), Dutch draughtsman and painter
Rien van der Velde (born 1957), Dutch politician

Places
Rien, Netherlands, a village in the province of Friesland, Netherlands
Rien (Norway), a lake in Norway

Music albums
Named after the French word for "nothing":
Rien (Faust album), 1994
Rien (Noël Akchoté album), 2000

Dutch masculine given names